Blockade (also known as Cul-de-sac) is a strategy board game for two players with the motto "beat the barrier". It's played on a board with an 11x14 grid of spaces, barriers and 2 mobile playing pieces per player. The object of the game is to maneuver ones pieces around barriers and into the opponents starting spaces. The game is long out of production.

History

Blockade was created by Philip Slater in 1975. In United States, it was published by Lakeside under the name Blockade. In France, Germany, Sweden, and United Kingdom the game was published by Lazy Days under the name Cul-de-sac (French, translation dead-end). Lakeside went bankrupt in 1983 and ceased production.

Gameplay and rules
The rules are simple, but it provides an interesting and deep game. Each player are given 2 pawns, 9 green walls (placed vertically), and 9 blue walls (placed horizontally). Pawns are placed on their starting locations on each of the four corners of the 11×14 board. First players' starting location is at [4,4] and [8,4], and the second players' is at [4,11] and [8,11].

The object of the game is for each player to get both their pawns to the starting locations of their opponent. The first to do so wins.

On each turn, a player moves one pawn one or two spaces (horizontally, vertically, or any combination of the two) and places one wall anywhere on the board (useful for blocking off their opponent's move). Walls always cover two squares and must be placed according to their color (vertically or horizontally). Pawns may jump over other pawns that are blocking their path. Once players are out of walls, they keep moving pawns until one wins.

Reviews
Games
1980 Games 100 in Games
Games & Puzzles
Jeux & Stratégie #6

See also 
Quoridor, a similar more modern game
Pinko Pallino
Quantum, a 1975 abstract strategy board game

References

External links
 Blockade at Game Geek

Board games introduced in 1975
Abstract strategy games
Games of mental skill